Erosida is a genus of beetles in the family Cerambycidae, containing the following species:

 Erosida delia Thomson, 1860
 Erosida formosa (Blanchard, 1847)
 Erosida gratiosa (Blanchard, 1847)
 Erosida lineola (Fabricius, 1781)
 Erosida yucatana Giesbert, 1985

References

Eburiini